HD 118285, also known as HR 5115, is a variable star located in the southern circumpolar constellation Chamaeleon. DY Chamaeleontis (DY Cha) is its variable star designation. It has an average apparent magnitude of 6.32, placing it near the limit for naked eye visibility. At its current distance, HD 118285's brightness is diminished by 0.58 magnitudes due to interstellar dust.

HD 118285's variability was first observed in a 1998 Hipparcos survey focusing on the discovery of slowly pulsating B-type stars (SPB). It was later confirmed to be an SPB star and given the variable designation DY Chamaeleontis. It fluctuates between magnitudes 6.34 and 6.38 in the visual passband with a period of 23 hours.

This is a slightly evolved B-type star with a stellar classification of B8 IV. Contrary to the classification, stellar evolution models from Zorec and Royer (2012) model it as a dwarf star that has completed 89.1% of its main sequence life. It has 3.6 times the mass of the Sun and 5.5 times its girth.

References

B-type subgiants
Slowly pulsating B stars
Chamaeleon (constellation)
Chamaeleontis, DY
Chamaeleontis, 49
CD-75 00632
118285
066607
5115